A chief medical informatics officer (CMIO, also sometimes referred to as a chief medical information officer, or chief clinical information officer - CCIO in the United Kingdom) is a healthcare executive generally responsible for the health informatics platform required to work with clinical IT staff  to support the efficient design, implementation, and use of health technology within a healthcare organization.

Typically the CMIO is a physician with some degree of formal health informatics training or a working equivalent thereof, who often works in conjunction with, or helps to manage other physician, nurse, pharmacy, and general informaticists within the organization.  According to the 2012 CMIO Survey, 60% had salaries higher than $200,000 per year.

While historically there have been physicians and others filling this role, the more formal CMIO position started around 1992  to help hospitals support the adoption and implementation of health technologies such as electronic medical records (EMRs), electronic health records (EHRs), computerized physician order entry (CPOE), electronic documentation, health information exchanges (HIEs), and other technologies used in the clinical setting. The trend for healthcare organizations to have a CMIO has continued to grow, and accelerated as technology use in the clinical setting has been stimulated by programs such as the 2009 Health Information Technology for Economic and Clinical Health Act (HITECH Act).

CMIOs generally report to either the chief medical officer (CMO), chief information officer (CIO), chief operations officer (COO), or chief executive officer (CEO). The exact roles and responsibilities vary widely, from organization to organization, often depending on the reporting structure, but they typically include at least one of the following:

 Strategic planning
 EMR Governance and Policy development
 Systems development and implementation
 Stakeholder engagement
 Capacity Building 
 Informatics education and platform development
 Data mining and quality reporting
 Education, Training and curriculum design

References

Health informatics
Health care occupations